Craig R. Baker is a retired United States Air Force brigadier general who last served as the vice commander of the Twelfth Air Force. Prior to that, he was the commander of the 455th Air Expeditionary Wing.

References

External links

Year of birth missing (living people)
Living people
Place of birth missing (living people)
United States Air Force generals
Date of birth missing (living people)